The Bulkley River in British Columbia is a major tributary of the Skeena River.

Much of the Bulkey is paralleled by Highway 16. It flows west from Bulkley Lake past Perow and is joined near Houston by the Morice River, its major tributary. The Bulkley continues north past Quick, Telkwa and Smithers.  It then meets the Skeena River near Hazelton. The Bulkley River is a major tourist destination for anglers targeting wild steelhead.

The river was originally called Wet'sinkwha ("blue and green river") by the Wet'suwet'en people, the indigenous inhabitants of the Bulkley Valley. The name Bulkley was given for Colonel Charles S. Bulkley, the U.S. Army engineer-in-charge of the survey team who, in 1866, explored the area in preparation for the failed Russian American Telegraph. The project was abandoned because of the success of the trans-Atlantic cable in 1866.

The Little Bulkley, a smaller stream running through Houston, and the Morice join just west of Houston. At the point of their joining they become the Bulkley, not the Morice, although the Morice is larger. This was done by Poudrier, a government cartographer who, it is rumoured, never saw the region.

See also 
 Bulkley Valley

References

External links 
 Water Quality Objectives for the Bulkley River Basin 

Bulkley Valley
Regional District of Bulkley-Nechako
Rivers of British Columbia
Cassiar Land District